St. Francis Hospital is a general medical and surgical hospital located in Columbus, Georgia, United States, and is accredited by the Joint Commission.

History 

In 1946, a number of prominent Columbus citizens came together in order to set a common goal for the entire community: fulfill the community's dire need for a modern, faith-based hospital. In the beginning, they raised $45 million in seed money that would firmly plant St. Francis Hospital amid a post-war economy that was severely drained by the mobilization efforts of World War II. The very first patient was admitted four years later in April 1950.

During the first year, the hospital admitted 4,733 patients. What began as a 154-bed hospital with 17 sisters, 171 lay people and 60 physicians has grown into a facility licensed for 376 beds with more than 1,400 full-time associates, 300 physicians, and a broad array of services, including the area's only open heart surgery program.

St. Francis Foundation 

The St. Francis Foundation was structured and incorporated on November 21, 1991.

St. Francis Society 

The St. Francis Society is made up of annual supporters. Society membership is open to individuals, couples, family foundations as well as privately help companies.

St. Francis Fellows 

Fellows are also given the ability to network with members of the medical community, community leaders and health care professionals. Membership to St. Francis Fellows is by invitation only.

 Fellows Health Care Scholarship
The Fellows scholarship is designed to assist qualified students who are interested in pursuing allied health programs at area colleges and universities while at the same time working with health care mentors throughout St. Francis Hospital.

Sister Patricia Garrigan Scholarship 

In 1993, the Sister Patricia Garrigan Scholarship Fund was established to honor Sister Patricia Garrigan for her 22 years of commitment as an administrator of St. Francis Hospital. The purpose of this scholarship is to educate worthy students pursuing health care careers within St. Francis Hospital. This scholarship may be awarded to employees or non-employees and the amount varies according to needs and is funded by the Cheers fund. The Sister Patricia Garrigan Scholarship does not cover undergraduate core curriculum.

Cheers 

CHEERS stands for Caring Hospital Employees Envision Real Success. The CHEERS annual campaign has become the centerpiece for all the caring work that has been accomplished by the employees of St. Francis since it first began in 1994. On average, 90 - 95 percent of the hospital's 1,600 plus employees contribute each year. As a direct result of their generosity, an estimated 10,000 individuals and families - including low income hospital patients - have received various forms of financial assistance. St. Francis covers all the administrative costs of CHEERS so that 100 percent of the contributions can go on to directly and positively affect others' lives.
CHEERS Supports:
 The Care Fund - Medical care given to the less fortunate patients of St. Francis. Indignant care patients receive prescription drug assistance as well as transportation when it is needed.
 The Share Fund - Emergency financial assistance for those - fellow employees included - in crisis.
 The Scholarship Fund - Scholarships for individuals that are interested in pursuing health care careers. The Sister Patricia Garrigan Scholarship Fund has gone on to assist over 60 students in their pursuit to gain a college education.
 United Way - The United Way of Chattahoochee Valley distributes funds to many outstanding community organizations that are in need of the community's support.

The Patrick Heart Institute of St. Francis 

The Patrick Heart Institute of St. Francis is a source for diagnosis, treatment and rehabilitation of patients with heart problems. St Francis was the first hospital in the area to perform open heart surgery, balloon angioplasty and automatic defibrillator tissue implants.

Cardiac Diagnostics 

The Institute utilizes diagnostic procedures to provide accurate analysis in order to determine treatment for patients with cardiovascular disease. These procedures range from non-invasive tests, such as the electrocardiogram (EKG), the electrophysiology (EP) test, stress tests, nuclear cardiolite studies, echo-cardiograms and Doppler flow studies, to more complex and sophisticated tests, such as coronary angiograms. Many of these tests can be performed on an outpatient basis. They serve as a helpful tool for evaluating heart and blood vessel abnormalities or as a tool to produce images of the heart muscle and valves. Additionally, the cardiologists at St. Francis have performed more than 15,000 cardiac catheterizations in the cardiac diagnostic laboratory.

Cardiac Intervention 

After a cardiac problem is accurately diagnosed, The Patrick Heart Institute of St. Francis - along with the patient's physician - can provide appropriate treatment through a number of valuable methods. For some patients, intervention such as coronary angioplasty or atherectomy may serve as possible alternatives to bypass surgery. Patients choosing to have angioplasty and atherectomy are usually discharged 24–48 hours after the procedure and, in most cases, resume full daily activities.

Cardiac Rehabilitation Program 

The Cardiac Rehabilitation Program at St. Francis Hospital is specifically designed for patients that have experienced: heart attack, heart surgery, heart angioplasty or stent, or a high risk for heart disease.

Emergency Department 
The St. Francis Hospital Emergency Department is staffed with physicians and nurses that have been specially trained in emergency medicine. St. Francis has two specially equipped cardiovascular care rooms. In a typical cardiac emergency, thrombolytic drugs can be utilized sometimes in order to dissolve blood clots and as a useful method to decrease any further damage to the heart of the patient. This is a front line defense against arrhythmia and heart attacks, and as such, must be administered at very least within the first six hours of the onset of a heart attack to be effective.

St. Francis' Emergency Department is relatively new. Patient safety was a mainstay at the very forefront of the design and planning process. This Emergency area provides rooms where any changes in patient condition, minor or critical, can be assessed. Bedside registration enhances any medical personnel's ability to respond quickly so that treatment is not delayed. The hospital also utilizes a pneumatic tube system as a means to send lab specimens for faster results. Lastly, a tactical measure aimed at decreasing the amount time-consuming paperwork is the hospital's computerized PIXIS system that keeps supplies and medications readily available.

ED FastTrack
The St. Francis FastTrack Emergency area serves patients with less urgent emergencies, including but not limited to such things as twisted ankles and headaches. The average wait is roughly 90 minutes. In 2003, St. Francis doubled its number of FastTrack beds after the new Emergency Department was completed.

St. Francis Orthopaedic Institute
On August 1, 2006, St. Francis Hospital along with the physicians at McCluskey Orthopaedic Surgery (MOS) formed the St. Francis Orthopaedic Institute. MOS underwent a natural transition, as the outpatient practice was located in the new St. Francis Medical Office Building and the inpatient practice was focused at St. Francis. The physicians at the Institute are certified or board eligible by the American Board of Orthopaedic Surgeons or the National Osteopathic Board of Orthopaedic Surgery. Most of these highly experienced orthopaedic surgeons are fellowship-trained in a sub-specialty area, such as shoulder surgery, foot & ankle surgery, or adult reconstructive and total joint replacement surgery. The practice management team has published numerous articles in medical textbooks and peer-reviewed journals. The Institute collaborates with St. Francis Hospital; the St. Francis Rehabilitation Center; and the McCluskey Education & Research Foundation, Inc., in order to offer the best hospital facilities rehabilitation services, research of musculoskeletal disorders, and educational materials for patients as well as for members of the greater Columbus area community.

Research and Education Center
The Research and Education Center is located within walking distance of the clinical offices of St. Francis Orthopaedic Institute, the physical therapy gymnasium of the St. Francis Rehabilitation Center, and the operating rooms of St. Francis Hospital.

St. Francis Adult Reconstruction Center
The Adult Reconstruction Center offers digital imaging suites, inpatient and outpatient surgical suites, outpatient rehabilitation facility as well as an orthopaedic unit with private rooms for inpatient care. The support staff provides patient education and training. They also collect data for clinical outcomes studies in a private area in order to ensure patient confidentiality. To support professional development, the Institute provides conference rooms, offices, an orthopaedic library and the services of its Research and Education Center. The Adult Reconstruction Center is a referral center that serves the southeastern United States. However, patients have the ability to make an appointment without a referral from another physician. Conditions treated at the facility include chronic & acute fractures, post-traumatic deformities and post-traumatic arthritis. The most modern innovations such as bone graft substitutes to the latest joint replacements are used to relieve pain and restore function.

St. Francis Foot and Ankle Center
The Foot and Ankle Center treats both chronic and acute conditions for ankle and foot disorders on both an operative and nonoperative care basis. It is one of few providers in the region that offers total ankle replacement as an alternative treatment for degenerative arthritis in the ankle. In 2009, the primary surgeon at the facility performed 616 outpatient and 186 inpatient procedures. The physicians at the facility have treated patients from 24 different states, and thirty percent of all the patients served on a daily basis travel from areas outside of the Chattahoochee Valley. The director of the Foot and Ankle Center, Lee McCluskey, Maryland, presented several keynote lectures in New Orleans at the 2008 North American Foot and Ankle Association meeting.

St. Francis Joint Replacement Center
The Joint Replacement Center offers treatments for over 100 different conditions. The surgeons serving at the facility provide nonoperative and operative care for arthritic joints of the lower and upper extremities. The nonoperative treatment consists of bracing; medications; and intra-articular injections, such as hyaluronate acid. In addition, the center offers less-common joint arthroplasty procedures including unicompartmental knee replacement, patellofemoral arthroplasty, hip-joint resurfacing as well as computer-assisted surgery. The surgeons operating at the facility can perform cemented or uncemented total hip replacement with the conventional metal on highly cross-linked polyethylene implants, large metal on metal implants, or ceramic on ceramic implants. Generally, they use conventional cruciate-retaining or cruciate-sacrificing implants in total knee replacement, while also offering, trabecular metal, sex-specific, and high-knee-flexion femoral implant designs in order to meet the needs of their patients.

St. Francis Sports Medicine Center
The Sports Medicine Center is located on the campus of St. Francis Hospital. The facility offers management and evaluation equipment including digital imaging and surgical suites, as well as a rehabilitation center. There is an arthroscopic teaching laboratory and clinical research staff that enable the physicians to constantly evolve and perfect the management and outcomes of their patients. The Sports Medicine Center is a referral center that serves the southeastern United States. The center routinely treats amateur, recreational, and professional athletes as well as non athletes for simple and complex lower and upper extremity musculoskeletal injuries.  The physicians that practice within the Sports Medicine Center are trained in, but not limited to procedures such as: arthroscopic rotator cuff repairs; arthroscopic treatment of shoulder instability; arthroscopic treatment of the elbow, hip, foot, and ankle; as well as arthroscopic knee reconstructions.

St. Francis Interventional Pain Management Center
The Pain Management Center provides management and evaluation of acute and chronic neck and back conditions. Both invasive and noninvasive treatments are available for the management of chronic and acute pain. The facilities include the medical office and digital imaging suites, an outpatient area for invasive pain management procedures, an outpatient rehabilitation facility, and an orthopaedic unit with private rooms for patient care.

The Elena Diaz-Verson Amos Center for Breast Health at St. Francis 

Breast cancer is typically treated by using a combination of local therapy as well as systemic therapy. The goal of local therapy is to destroy the cancer cells held in the breast as well as the related lymph nodes, which helps minimize the risk of recurrence. Systemic therapy involves destroying tumor cells that may have diluted into the circulation while at the same time it minimizes the risk associated with developing distant sites of potential tumor growth. In 2008, St. Francis became the first facility in Georgia to offer Breast-Specific Gamma imaging for difficult to diagnose breast abnormalities.

Other Services

The Bradley Center 
Founded in 1955, The Bradley Center campus is an 84-bed facility aimed at providing an environment for mental health care. Services include addiction treatment, inpatient as well as day treatment, support groups, respite day care and positively enhanced educational programs.

Franciscan Woods 

Franciscan Woods is an assisted living community provided by St. Francis Hospital Hospital. It is a 60-unit personal care facility that caters to the residents of the community and their individual needs by assisting them with activities of family living, such as: eating, bathing, dressing and ambulating.

The St. Francis Wellness Center 
The  facility houses cardiovascular machines.

The Trinity Center for Women 
The Trinity Center for Women is a community service of St. Francis. The center helps soon to be mothers navigate each stage of pregnancy, offering prenatal care, education and compassionate support. The goal of the center is to provide all women - regardless of their circumstances, ability to pay or how far along they are in their pregnancy - with access to board-certified OB/GYN physicians as well as certified midwives.

Milestones

1950 - 1960 
 St. Francis Hospital admits its first patient April 17, 1950.
 The first baby is born at St. Francis before February 1951.
 St. Francis breaks ground for a School of Nursing in 1957; it opens in 1959.

1961 - 1970 
 In 1966, the hospital's leadership begins planning for a six-story addition that would add 58 beds to the facility.

1971 - 1980 
 From 1971 to 1974, a $6.5 million expansion program doubles the number of beds to 138, while adding space and equipment for X-ray, operating rooms and physical therapy.
 Dr. Philip Brewer, along with surgeon Dr. Frank Collins, cardiologist Dr. Gordon Miller and perfusionist John Schumacher, develop the area's first cardiac surgery program at St. Francis Hospital; in 1974, Dr. Brewer performs the hospital's first open heart surgery.
 By 1977, hospital leadership plans for the addition of a $1.5 million laboratory and operating room in order to handle the ever-increasing number of open heart surgeries at St. Francis.
 Orthopaedic surgery and rehabilitation programs are developed during the 70s at St. Francis.

1981 - 1990 
 In 1981, a $4.7 million expansion enlarges facilities for respiratory and physical therapy, including a cardiac rehabilitation gym.
 Safety cab is launched in 1982 to help reduce the number of DUI-related accidents that regularly occurred during the holidays, the program offers a free ride home to party goers.
 In 1984, St. Francis starts a pulmonary rehabilitation program.
 By 1986, St. Francis receives a Certificate of Need (CON) from the Georgia State Health Planning agency for a $9.3 million expansion.
 Additional expansion in 1987 includes a larger Emergency Department, Intensive Care Unit, Cardiac Care Unit, expanded Radiology Department, new procedure rooms as well as new waiting rooms.

1991 - 2000 
 In 1994, St. Francis purchases The Bradley Center, a non profit psychiatric hospital.
 In 1995, St. Francis opens Health Matters, a community resource center.
 In the fall of 1997, St. Francis completes a two-year renovation project of all acute inpatient units. In response to patient requests, the renovation includes the creation of more private rooms. During the same year, St. Francis commissions plans for renovation; the project begins in late 1997.
 In December 1997, the Wound Care Center of St. Francis opens.
 In 1998, renovations are complete, creating a newly designed front entrance and new central energy plant. Also, The Heart Institute of St. Francis partners with the Emory Heart Center in July 1998 to offer the area its first complete electrophysiology test.
 In June 1999, St. Francis breaks ground for an assisted living facility; Franciscan Woods opens April 15, 2000.
 In December 2000, The American Diabetes Association recognizes the Diabetes Self-Management Program at St. Francis Hospital.
 In 2000, Dr. Thomas Lawhorne of Columbus Cardiovascular Surgery performs the region's first 'less invasive' procedure for abdominal aortic aneurysms.
 To celebrate its 50th anniversary, St. Francis partners with the American Heart Association and donates 50 automated external defibrillators (AEDs) throughout Columbus; the largest single deployment of AEDs in Georgia to ever take place.

2001 - 2010 
 In 2002, St. Francis becomes only the 5th hospital in the United States to utilize the Bridge MedPoint System in order to help prevent errors at patients' bedsides.
 In 2002, the Emergency Department of St. Francis sees 42,000 patients, which is an increase of 4,000 people from 2001.
 The Patrick Heart Institute of St. Francis opens a Sleep Disorders Center in 2002.
 In 2003, St. Francis completes a three-year $45 million expansion, resulting in new surgical suites; the addition of a new sterile processing are for added safety; and an Emergency Department (ED). The new ED offers a 'fast track' to expedite the care of non-critically ill patients.
 In 2003, the new Medical Office Building opens and the third phase of the hospital's $45 million expansion is complete. The offices put physicians in closer proximity to their hospitalized patients.
 Also in 2003, St. Francis begins operating a state-of-the-art cardiac catheterization X-ray lab, which enables the hospital to offer minimally invasive procedures from a wide range of problems, including coronary artery disease.
 In 2004, the first Fellows program is launched by the St. Francis Foundation, enabling community leaders to learn about health care from a behind the scenes view at St. Francis.
 In 2004, St. Francis serves 89,000 inpatients, outpatients and emergency room patients.
 In the Spring of 2005, St. Francis dedicates The Carl and Frances Patrick Heart Institute of St. Francis, named in honor of the couple who gave more than $1.5m million toward cardiac care at St. Francis.
 In 2005, The Patrick Heart Institute performs 41,534 diagnostic tests, 856 stent procedures and 322 open heart surgeries.
 Also in 2005, The Bradley Center treats 1,260 inpatients & 568 outpatients; 556 children and adolescents are served, including 228 indignant children and youth who received crisis stabilization services.
 The St. Francis Orthopaedic Institute is established in the Fall of 2006. It serves in partnership between St. Francis Hospital and McCluskey Orthopaedic Surgery.
 In late 2006, the surgeons of Columbus Surgical Associates join with St. Francis to form the St. Francis Center for Surgical Care.
 The 2006 CHEERS employee giving campaign raises $110,087; cumulative CHEERS giving hits the $1 million mark.
 Also in 2006, The Center for Breast Health is renamed in memory of Elena Diaz-Verson Amos to honor the generosity of the Amos family. The estate of John and Elena Amos pledged $1 million toward breast health services and new technology at the center.
 In 2007, St. Francis and Columbus Regional Healthcare partner to consolidate behavioral health care services in one location at The Bradley Center.
 St. Francis becomes the area's first Primary Stroke Center in 2007, earning certification from The Joint Commission.
 In 2007, St. Francis is awarded the Josh Nahum Award for Achievement in Infection Prevention and Control for its "Coronary Artery Bypass Graft Surgery-Surgical Site Infection Prevention Project" by the Georgia Hospital Association. The project achieved a zero percent deep sternal wound infection rate at St. Francis.
 The St. Francis Center for Digestive Disorders opens in 2007.
 In 2008, St. Francis becomes Columbus' first Chest Pain Center, achieving accreditation by the Society of Chest Pain Centers.
 In 2008, St. Francis adds a Spine and Neurosurgery Center to the St. Francis Orthopaedic Institute.
 The Bradley Center opens a new Clinical Behavioral Health Unit in 2008 to serve geriatric and other patients who require medical treatment as well as psychiatric care.
 In August 2009, The Bradley Center expands its child/adolescent psychiatric services.
 The Trinity Center for Women opens in December 2009; the goal is to provide quality OB/GYN care for low income women and lower the area's rate of infant mortality.
 The Cardiac Rehabilitation program at St. Francis is certified by the American Association of Cardiovascular and Pulmonary rehabilitation.
 On March 31, 2010, St. Francis receives approval from the state of Georgia to expand and renovate its facility.

2011 - 2012 
 In February 2012, Mercer University announced it will partner with St. Francis and The Medical Center, a hospital in the Columbus Regional Healthcare System, to create a medical campus in Columbus; starting in the summer of 2012, the hospitals will provide clinical rotations for up to 80 third and fourth year students from Mercer's School of Medicine.  The partnership will create Mercer's third medical school campus joining existing campuses in Macon and Savannah.

References 

Hospital buildings completed in 1950
Hospitals in Georgia (U.S. state)
Buildings and structures in Columbus, Georgia
1950 establishments in Georgia (U.S. state)